Lacconectus spangleri, is a species of predaceous diving beetle widespread in India, Bangladesh, Bhutan, Myanmar, Nepal, Pakistan, and Sri Lanka.

References 

Dytiscidae
Insects of Sri Lanka
Insects described in 1986